Tim O'Toole may refer to:
Tim O'Toole (basketball), American basketball coach
Tim O'Toole (businessman), chief executive of transport company FirstGroup